Dil Ka Rishta is a 2003 Indian Hindi romance film, directed by Naresh Malhotra and produced by Aditya Rai. It was produced by Rai's production house Target Films and Tips Industries Limited. The film stars Arjun Rampal and Aishwarya Rai with Priyanshu Chatterjee, Isha Koppikar, Rakhee Gulzar and Paresh Rawal in supporting roles. The music is composed by Nadeem Shravan and the lyrics are penned by Sameer

Plot
Jai is a wealthy young man who supports many charities. One day, he accompanies his friend, Anita to a school for the deaf, which he is sponsoring. There, he meets Tia, a teacher, and develops feelings for her. He tries to court her, believing that Tia feels something for him too. Tia, on the other hand, views him simply as a good friend. When he finally admits his feelings, Tia reveals the existence of her fiancé, Raj. Despite knowing of her engagement, Jai relentlessly pursues Tia, who soon angrily rejects him. Tia marries Raj, they have a baby son named Anshu, and live a poor but happy life together. Jai is left devastated.

One night Jai becomes extremely drunk and drives home with Anita, soon colliding with another car. A plot twist reveals that Tia and Raj were in the other car. Anita and Raj are killed at the scene, while Tia survives but loses her memory.

Tia's doctors believe that Tia won't be able to handle the mental anguish caused by the return of her memories, advising her mother to move Tia to a place where nothing'll remind her of her past. Jai, overcome with guilt for being the cause of her condition, offers Tia and her mother his house in South Africa so that she can recuperate. Tia's mother accepts for Tia's sake, even though she loathes Jai for causing the accident. Tia is informed that she had been in a car accident with Jai and Anita, who was her best friend, and that Anshu is Jai and Anita's son. She is also told that she had always looked after Anshu as an aunt, and is encouraged to continue acting as a motherly figure to him.

In South Africa, Tia's mother realizes that Tia is developing feelings for Jai and warns him not to encourage or reciprocate her feelings. Full of self-hatred, Jai keeps his distance from Tia despite her attempts to befriend him. Jai's father tries to set them up but Jai refuses, even though he still loves her. Tia's mother, eventually realizing that she wants a complete family life for Tia and Anshu, accepts the fact that her daughter is in love with Jai and gives her blessing. However, Jai's guilt causes him to refuse a relationship with Tia.

Tia confronts Jai about his distant attitude towards her, and they argue. Tia flees and Jai follows her. When she threatens to commit suicide, Jai is forced to admit that Anshu is Tia's son, Anita was his friend, and that her husband Raj died in the accident as well.

The film concludes with a final confrontation between all the characters. Jai's father and Tia's mother arrive at the scene. Tia forgives Jai for the accident, believing that it was her destiny, because she has no memory of her past. She states her intention to leave and start a new life with her mother and Anshu, but Jai asks her to marry him, which she accepts.

Cast
 Arjun Rampal as Jai Mehta
 Aishwarya Rai as Tia Sharma
 Rakhee Gulzar as Mrinalini Sharma, Tia's mother
 Paresh Rawal as Harshavardhan Mehta, Jai's father
 Hitanshu Lodhia as Anshu, Raj and Tia's son
 Priyanshu Chatterjee as Raj (cameo appearance) 
 Isha Koppikar as Anita (cameo appearance)

Soundtrack

The music is composed by Nadeem-Shravan with lyrics by Sameer. The music of this movie went on to become highly successful. Manish Dhamija of Planet Bollywood in his review gave the album 7 stars out of 10. According to the Indian trade website Box Office India, with around 14,00,000 units sold, this film's soundtrack album was the year's one of the highest selling. The movie is a modern take on Kinara released in 1977

References

External links
 

2003 films
2000s Hindi-language films
Films scored by Nadeem–Shravan
Indian romantic drama films
2003 romantic drama films